Thomas Kendall Drake (August 7, 1912 – July 2, 1988) was a Major League Baseball right-handed pitcher.

In 1935, Drake started his professional baseball career with the New Orleans Pelicans of the Southern Association. He pitched 15 innings for the Cleveland Indians in 1939 but gave up 15 earned runs and was sent back down to the minors.

In July 1941, Drake had a 9–5 record with the Nashville Vols when the Brooklyn Dodgers acquired him in a trade. He started two games for them, going 1–1. He spent the rest of his career in the minor leagues.

References

External links

1912 births
1988 deaths
Baseball players from Birmingham, Alabama
Brooklyn Dodgers players
Cleveland Indians players
Jacksonville State Gamecocks baseball players
Major League Baseball pitchers
Troy Trojans baseball players
New Orleans Pelicans (baseball) players
Milwaukee Brewers (minor league) players
Buffalo Bisons (minor league) players
Atlanta Crackers players
Nashville Vols players
Toronto Maple Leafs (International League) players
Macon Peaches players
Charleston Rebels players
Lakeland Pilots players
Fort Lauderdale Braves players
Tampa Smokers players
West Palm Beach Indians players